Julkkis Big Brother was the first celebrity season and the ninth season overall of the Finnish reality television series Big Brother. It was premiered on 3 September 2013, on Sub. This season finished in 6 weeks. The host was Mari Sainio again. The prize was €25 000.

Housemates

Nominations table 
The first housemate in each box was nominated for two points, and the second housemate was nominated for one point.

Notes 
 : The public voted for a mystery opening night twist. The options were 3 and 4. Nothing else were given at the time. When the voting was over, it was revealed what those options meant. The last housemate to enter (Andy) would nominate 3 or 4 housemates for eviction. 3 got more votes, so Andy will decide 3 housemates who will be up for eviction. Also, Andy himself is immune. He nominated Kai, Frederik and Claudia.
 : This week the nominations were fake.
 : This week, the public nominates. The two housemates with the most votes will be nominated, Aleks (30.71%) and Sara (24.98%). Then, the housemates who weren't nominated will vote to evict one of them on Friday.

Nominations total received 

 Week 6 numbers don't count, as it wasn't nominations, it was a vote to evict.

Nominations: Results

Notes

References

External links
 Official Website 
 World of Big Brother Forum

2013 Finnish television seasons
09
Finland